Madhya Pradesh (meaning 'central province') is a state in central India. Its capital is Bhopal, and the largest city is Indore, with Jabalpur, Ujjain, Gwalior, Sagar and Satna being the other major cities. Madhya Pradesh is the second largest Indian state by area and the fifth largest state by population with over 72 million residents. It borders the states of Uttar Pradesh to the northeast, Chhattisgarh to the east, Maharashtra to the south, Gujarat to the west, and Rajasthan to the northwest.

The area covered by the present-day Madhya Pradesh includes the area of the ancient Avanti Mahajanapada, whose capital Ujjain (also known as Avantika) arose as a major city during the second wave of Indian urbanisation in the sixth century BCE. Subsequently, the region was ruled by the major dynasties of India. The Maratha Empire dominated the majority of the 18th century. After the Anglo-Maratha Wars in the 19th century, the region was divided into several princely states under the British and incorporated into Central Provinces and Berar and the Central India Agency. After India's independence, Madhya Pradesh state was created with Nagpur as its capital: this state included the southern parts of the present-day Madhya Pradesh and northeastern portion of today's Maharashtra. In 1956, this state was reorganised and its parts were combined with the states of Madhya Bharat, Vindhya Pradesh and Bhopal to form the new Madhya Pradesh state, the Marathi-speaking Vidarbha region was removed and merged with the Bombay State. This state was the largest in India by area until 2000, when its southeastern Chhattisgarh region was designated a separate state.

Madhya Pradesh ranks 23rd among Indian states in human development index. Rich in mineral resources, Madhya Pradesh has the largest reserves of diamond and copper in India. 25.14% of its area is under forest cover. Its tourism industry has seen considerable growth, with the state topping the National Tourism Awards in 2010–11. In recent years, the state's GDP growth has been above the national average. In 2019–20, state's GSDP was recorded at 9.07.

History 

Isolated remains of Homo erectus found in Hathnora in the Narmada Valley indicates that Madhya Pradesh might have been inhabited in the Middle Pleistocene era. Painted pottery dated to the later mesolithic period has been found in the Bhimbetka rock shelters. Chalcolithic sites belonging to Kayatha culture and Malwa culture (1700–1500 BCE) have been discovered in the western part of the state. Madhya Pradesh is also the world's ninth-most populous subnational entity.

The city of Ujjain arose as a major centre in the region, during the second wave of Indian urbanisation in the sixth century BCE. It has served as the capital of the Avanti kingdom. Other kingdoms mentioned in ancient epicsMalava, Karusha, Dasarna and Nishadahave also been identified with parts of Madhya Pradesh.

Chandragupta Maurya conquered northern India around 320 BCE, establishing the Mauryan Empire, which included all of modern-day Madhya Pradesh. Ashoka the greatest of Mauryan rulers, conquered it, bringing the region under firmer control. After the decline of the Maurya empire, the region was contested among the Sakas, the Kushanas, the Satavahanas, and several local dynasties during the 1st to 3rd centuries CE. Heliodorus, the Greek Ambassador to the court of the Shunga King Bhagabhadra erected the Heliodorus pillar near Vidisha.

The Satavahana dynasty of the northern Deccan and the Saka dynasty of the Western Satraps fought for the control of Madhya Pradesh during the 1st to 3rd centuries CE.

The Satavahana King Gautamiputra Satakarni inflicted a crushing defeat upon the Saka rulers and conquered parts of Malwa and Gujarat in the 2nd century CE.

Subsequently, the region was conquered by the Gupta empire in the 4th and 5th centuries, and their southern neighbours, the Vakataka's. The rock-cut temples at Bagh Caves in the Kukshi tehsil of the Dhar District show the presence of the Gupta dynasty in the region, supported by the testimony of a Badwani inscription dated to the year of 487 CE. The attacks of the Hephthalites or White Huns brought about the collapse of the Gupta empire, which broke up into smaller states. The King Yasodharman of Malwa defeated the Huns in 528, ending their expansion. Later, Harsha (c. 590–647) ruled the northern parts of the state. Malwa was ruled by the south Indian Rashtrakuta Dynasty from the late 8th century to the 10th century. When the south Indian Emperor Govinda III of the Rashtrakuta dynasty annexed Malwa, he set up the family of one of his subordinates there, who took the name of Paramara.

The Medieval period saw the rise of the Rajput clans, including the Paramaras of Malwa and the Chandelas of Bundelkhand. The Chandellas built the majestic Hindu-Jain temples at Khajuraho, which represent the culmination of Hindu temple architecture in Central India. The Gurjara-Pratihara dynasty also held sway in northern and western Madhya Pradesh at this time. It also left some monuments of architectural value in Gwalior. Southern parts of Madhya Pradesh like Malwa were several times invaded by the south Indian Western Chalukya Empire which imposed its rule on the Paramara kingdom of Malwa. The Paramara King Bhoja (c. 1010–1060) was claimed to be a renowned polymath. The small Gond kingdoms emerged in the Gondwana and Mahakoshal regions of the state. Northern Madhya Pradesh was conquered by the Turkic Delhi Sultanate in the 13th century. After the collapse of the Delhi Sultanate at the end of the 14th century, independent regional kingdoms re-emerged, including the Tomara kingdom of Gwalior and the Muslim Sultanate of Malwa, with its capital at Mandu.

The Malwa Sultanate was conquered by the Sultanate of Gujarat in 1531. In the 1540s, most parts of the state fell to Sher Shah Suri, and subsequently to the Hindu King Hemu. Hemu, who had earlier served as the General of the Islamic Suri dynasty, operated from the Gwalior Fort during 1553–56 and became the ruler of Delhi as a Vikramaditya king winning 22 battles continuously from Bengal to Gujrat and defeating Akbar's forces in the Battle of Delhi on 7 October 1556. However, he chose Delhi as his capital after his formal Coronation and left Gwalior. After Hemu's defeat by Akbar at the Second Battle of Panipat in 1556, most of Madhya Pradesh came under the Mughal rule. Gondwana and Mahakoshal remained under the control of Gond kings, who acknowledged Mughal suzerainty but enjoyed virtual autonomy.

The Mughal control weakened considerably after the death of Emperor Aurangzeb in 1707. Between 1720 and 1760, the Marathas conquered most of Madhya Pradesh, resulting in the establishment of semi-autonomous states under the nominal control of the Peshwa of Pune: the Holkars of Indore ruled much of Malwa, Pawars ruled Dewas and Dhar, the Bhonsles of Nagpur dominated Mahakoshal-Gondwana area, while the Scindias of Gwalior controlled the northern parts of the state. The most notable Maratha rulers of the region were Mahadji Shinde, Ahilyabai Holkar and Yashwantrao Holkar. Besides these, there were several other small states, including Bhopal, Orchha, and Rewa. The Bhopal state, which paid tribute to both the Marathas and the Nizam of Hyderabad, was founded by Dost Mohammed Khan, a former General in the Mughal army.

After the Third Anglo-Maratha War, the British conquered the entire region. All the sovereign states in the region became princely states of British India, governed by the Central India Agency. The Mahakoshal region became a British province: the Saugor and Nerbudda Territories. In 1861, the British merged the Nagpur Province with the Saugor and Nerbudda Territories to form the Central Provinces.

During the 1857 uprising, rebellions happened in the northern parts of the state, led by leaders like Tatya Tope. However, these were crushed by the British and the princes loyal to them. The state witnessed a number of anti-British activities and protests during the Indian independence movement. Several notable leaders such as Chandra Shekhar Azad, B. R. Ambedkar, Shankar Dayal Sharma, Atal Bihari Vajpayee and Arjun Singh were born in what is now Madhya Pradesh.

After the independence of India, Madhya Pradesh was created in 1950 from the former British Central Provinces and Berar and the princely states of Makrai and Chhattisgarh, with Nagpur as the capital of the state. The new states of Madhya Bharat, Vindhya Pradesh, and Bhopal were formed out of the Central India Agency. In 1956, the states of Madhya Bharat, Vindhya Pradesh, and Bhopal were merged into Madhya Pradesh, and the Marathi-speaking southern region Vidarbha, which included Nagpur, was ceded to Bombay state. Jabalpur was chosen to be the capital of the state but at the last moment, due to political interference, Bhopal was made the state capital. In November 2000, as part of the Madhya Pradesh Reorganization Act, the southeastern portion of the state split off to form the new state of Chhattisgarh.

Geography

Location in India 
Madhya Pradesh literally means "Central Province", and is located in the geographic heart of India in between the latitude of 21.6°N–26.30°N and longitude of 74°9'E–82°48'E. The state straddles the Narmada River, which runs east and west between the Vindhya and Satpura ranges; these ranges and the Narmada are the traditional boundaries between the north and south of India. The highest point in Madhya Pradesh is Dhupgarh, with an elevation of 1,350 m (4,429 ft).

The state is bordered on the west by Gujarat, on the northwest by Rajasthan, on the northeast by Uttar Pradesh, on the east by Chhattisgarh, and on the south by Maharashtra.

Climate 
Madhya Pradesh also has three major seasons – Summer, Monsoon, and Winter. During summer (March–June), the temperature in the entire state ranges above 34.6 it has increased as it is all time high in Madhya Pradesh. In general, the eastern parts of Madhya Pradesh are hotter than the western parts. The regions like Gwalior, Morena and Datia record temperatures of over 42 °C in May. The humidity is relatively very low and the region usually experiences frequent mild dust storms. The southwest Monsoon usually breaks out in mid-June and the entire state receives a major share of its rainfall between June and September. The south and south-east regions tend to experience a higher rainfall whereas the parts of the north-west receive less. Mandla, Balaghat, Sidhi, Jabalpur, and other extreme eastern parts receive more than 150 cm of rainfall. The districts of western Madhya Pradesh receive less than 80 cm of rainfall.

The winter season starts in November. The temperature remains low in the northern parts of the state in comparison to the southern parts. The daily maximum temperature in most of the northern part of January remains between 15 and 18 °C. The climate is generally dry and pleasant with a clear sky.

Ecology 
According to the 2011 figures, the recorded forest area of the state is  constituting 30.7% of the geographical area of the state. It constitutes 12.3% of the forest area of India. Legally this area has been classified into "Reserved Forest" (65.3%), "Protected Forest" (32.8%) and "Unclassified Forest" (0.2%). The forest cover is less dense in the northern and western parts of the state, which contain the major urban centres. Variability in climatic and edaphic conditions brings about significant difference in the forest types of the state. In January 2019 1.5 million volunteers in the state planted 66 million trees in 12 hours along the Narmada river.

The major types of soils found in the state are:
 Black soil, most predominantly in the Malwa region, Mahakoshal and in southern Bundelkhand
 Red and yellow soil, in the Baghelkhand region
 Alluvial soil, in Northern Madhya Pradesh
 Laterite soil, in highland areas
 Mixed soil, in parts of the Gwalior and Chambal divisions

Flora and fauna 

Madhya Pradesh is home to ten National Parks; Bandhavgarh National Park, Kanha National Park, Satpura National Park, Sanjay National Park, Madhav National Park, Van Vihar National Park, Mandla Plant Fossils National Park, Panna National Park, Pench National Park and Dinosaur National Park, Dhar.

There are also a number of nature reserves, including Amarkantak, Bagh Caves, Balaghat, Bori Natural Reserve, Ken Gharial, Ghatigaon, Kuno Palpur, Narwar, Chambal, Kukdeshwar, Chidi Kho, Nora Dehi, Pachmarhi, Panpatha, Shikarganj, Patalkot, and Tamia. Pachmarhi Biosphere Reserve in Satpura Range, Amarkantak biosphere reserve and Panna National Park are three of the 18 biosphere reserves in India. Most of them are located in eastern Madhya Pradesh near Jabalpur.

Kanha, Bandhavgarh, Pench, Panna, and Satpura National Parks are managed as Project Tiger areas. The National Chambal Sanctuary is managed for conservation of gharial and mugger, river dolphin, smooth-coated otter and a number of turtle species. Ken-gharial and Son-gharial sanctuaries are managed for conservation of gharial and mugger. The barasingha is the state animal and the dudhraj is the state bird of Madhya Pradesh.

Based on composition, the teak and sal forests are the important forest formations in the state. Bamboo-bearing areas are widely distributed.

State symbols of Madhya Pradesh

Rivers 

The Narmada is the longest river in Madhya Pradesh. It flows westward through a rift valley, with the Vindhya ranges sprawling along its northern bank and the Satpura range of mountains along the southern. Its tributaries include the Banjar, the Tawa, the Machna, the Shakkar, the Denwa and the Sonbhadra rivers. The Tapti River runs parallel to Narmada, and also flows through a rift valley. The Narmada–Tapti systems carry an enormous volume of water and provide drainage for almost a quarter of the land area of Madhya Pradesh. The Narmada river is considered very sacred and is worshipped throughout the region. It is the main source of water and acts as a lifeline to the state.

The Vindhyas form the southern boundary of the Ganges basin, with the western part of the Ganges basin draining into the Yamuna and the eastern part directly into the Ganges itself. All the rivers, which drain into the Ganges, flow from south to north, with the Chambal, Shipra, Kali Sindh, Parbati, Kuno, Sind, Betwa, Dhasan and Ken rivers being the main tributaries of the Yamuna. Shipra River is one of the most sacred rivers of Hinduism. It is the site of the Simhastha Kumbh Mela, which is held every 12 years. The land drained by these rivers is agriculturally rich, with the natural vegetation largely consisting of grass and dry deciduous forest types, largely thorny. The eastern part of the Ganges basin consists of the Son, the Tons and the Rihand Rivers. Son, which arises in the Maikal hills around Amarkantak, is the largest tributary that goes into the Ganges on the south bank and that does not arise from the Himalayas. Son and its tributaries contribute the bulk of the monsoon flow into the Ganges, because the north bank tributaries are all snow fed. The forests in their basins are much richer than the thorn forests of the northwestern part of Madhya Pradesh.

After the formation of Chhattisgarh State, the major portion of Mahanadi basin now lies in Chhattisgarh. Presently, only 154 km2 basin area of Hasdeo River in Anuppur District lies in Madhya Pradesh.

The Satpuras, in the Gawilgarh and Mahadeo Hills, also contain a watershed, which is south facing. The Wainganga, the Wardha, the Pench, the Kanhan rivers, discharge an enormous volume of water into the Godavari river system. The Godavari basin consists of sub-tropical, semi-moist forests, mainly in the valley of the Indrawati. There are many important multi-state irrigation projects in development, including the Godavari River Basin Irrigation Projects.

Regions 
Madhya Pradesh is divided into the following agro-climatic zones:

 Kaimur Plateau and Satpura Hills
 Vindhyan Plateau (Hills)
 Narmada valley
 Wainganga valley
 Gird (Gwalior) Region
 Bundelkhand Region
 Satpura Plateau (Hills)
 Malwa Plateau
 Nimar Plateau
 Jhabua Hills

Administration 

Madhya Pradesh is divided into 52 districts for administrative purposes. The district is the main unit of administration. These districts are arranged in 10 divisions, listed below:

 Bhopal Division
 Chambal Division
 Gwalior Division
 Indore Division
 Jabalpur Division
 Narmadapuram Division
 Rewa Division
 Sagar Division
 Shahdol Division
 Ujjain Division

Cities

Demographics

Population 

The population of Madhya Pradesh consists of a number of ethnic groups and tribes, castes and communities. The scheduled castes and the scheduled tribes constitute a significant portion of the population of the State 15.6% and 21.1% respectively.

The main tribal groups in Madhya Pradesh are Gond, Bhil, Baiga, Korku, Bhadia (or Bhariya), Halba, Kaul, Mariya, Malto and Sahariya. Mandla, Dhar, Dindori, Barwani, Jhabua and Alirajpur districts have more than 50% tribal population, with Jhabua and Alirajpur having nearly 90% tribal population. In Khargone, Khandwa, Burhanpur, Betul, Chhindwara, Seoni, Anuppur, Umaria, Shahdol and Singrauli districts 30–50% of the population is tribal. According to the 2011 census, the tribal population in Madhya Pradesh was 15.34 million, constituting 21.1% of the total population. There were 46 recognised Scheduled Tribes and three of them have been identified as "Special Primitive Tribal Groups" in the State.

Madhya Pradesh ranks(33rd) on the Human Development Index value of 0.606 (2018). According to the SDG India Index 2020–21 compiled by the NITI AAYOG, Madhya pradesh ranks 21 on sustainable development goals. The state's per-capita gross state domestic product (nominal GDP) is the 26th in the country (2018–19). According to NITI Aayog SDGs India index the state ranks 9th on gender equality, 10th on clean water and sanitation.

Languages 

The official language of the state is Hindi, which is spoken by over two-thirds of the population and is used for all government business. In urban areas Standard Hindi is the main language, while Urdu is spoken by Muslims. In rural areas, however, most speak varieties counted as dialects of Hindi in the census, although most are quite distinct. In the west are Malvi and Nimadi in the Malwa and Nimar regions, which are more closely related to the Rajasthani languages. In Bundelkhand in the north and Baghelkhand in the east are spoken Bundeli and Bagheli which are eastern varieties of the Hindi languages, similar to Awadhi or Chhattisgarhi. In the southeast is spoken Chhattisgarhi and Powari is the language of the far south, both Eastern Hindi languages. Most speakers of these languages consider them to be dialects of Hindi and so report their language as 'Hindi' on the census.

Marathi is another significant language. Due to Maratha rule over much of what is now Madhya Pradesh, Madhya Pradesh is home to the largest number of Marathis outside Maharashtra. Although large numbers of Marathis can be found in urban centres like Indore, the highest concentrations are in the southern areas of the state adjoining Maharashtra. Marathi is the most-spoken language in Burhanpur district, while it is a major minority language in the southern parts of Mahakoshal especially Betul, Chhindwara and Balaghat districts.

There are several languages spoken by the Adivasis. The various Bhil languages are Indo-Aryan languages spoken by 50 lakh Bhils of western Madhya Pradesh. Although many, especially in the eastern parts of their range, have adopted the regional languages as mother tongue, the languages are still strong in the far-western hills especially Barwani, Jhabua and Alirajpur districts where they are in the majority. Bhili, the Bareli languages and Bhilali are the major varieties spoken in the state.

Gondi is the second-largest Adivasi language, spoken by 11 lakh Gonds in the state. A Dravidian language related to Telugu, it is mainly spoken in the southern Satpura highlands of Mahakoshal, where it is spoken with the regional languages. Some in the remoter valleys of the Satpuras speak a poorly-described Dravidian dialect called Bharia. Smaller minorities of Gondi speakers can be found in Khandwa and Dewas districts in the west as well as Anuppur, Sidhi and Singrauli districts in the east. Elsewhere in the state, the Gonds have almost totally abandoned their original language.

Korku, a Munda language, has over 4 lakh speakers in the central highlands of the state. In the far-southeast of Burhanpur can be found some speakers of the language isolate Nihali who live among the Korku. All speakers of tribal languages face significant pressure to switch to the dominant regional languages while their own tongues are considered 'backward' and 'rural'.

The following languages are taught in schools in Madhya Pradesh under the Three Language Formula:

First language: Any Scheduled Language

Second language: Hindi, Urdu or English

Third language: Another Scheduled Language, Arabic, Persian, French, Russian

Religion 
Hinduism is the main religion and is followed by 90.9% of the population.

According to the census of 2011, 90.9% of residents followed Hinduism, while minorities are Muslim (6.6%), Jain (0.8%), Buddhists (0.3%), Christians (0.3%), and Sikhs (0.2%). Madhya Pradesh is home to several pilgrimage sites including Amarkantak at the source of the Narmada and the Ghats of Omkareshwar, also on the Narmada. Temples can be found throughout the state. Buddhism and Jainism were once prominent religions in the state, especially in the central plateau near Raisen and Bhopal. Malwa is still home to a significant Jain minority. Jains are particularly concentrated in the urban centres of the Malwa region. Islam arrived with Muslim rule in the 14th century, although its influence was and is limited to major urban centres. Islam is a major religion in Bhopal and Burhanpur, and Bhopal is home to many prominent Islamic shrines. Buddhism in modern times is mainly practiced by Marathis in the south. Most respondents who answered 'Other' self-identified as following Adivasi religions such as Koya Punem of the Gonds.

Culture 

Three sites in Madhya Pradesh have been declared World Heritage Sites by UNESCO: the Khajuraho Group of Monuments (1986) including Devi Jagadambi temple, Khajuraho, Buddhist Monuments at Sanchi (1989) and the Rock Shelters of Bhimbetka (2003). Other architecturally significant or scenic sites include
Ajaigarh, Amarkantak, Asirgarh, Bandhavgarh, Bawangaja, Bhopal, Vidisha, Chanderi, Chitrakuta, Dhar, Gwalior, Indore, Nemavar, Jabalpur, Burhanpur, Maheshwar, Mandleshwar, Mandu, Omkareshwar, Orchha, Pachmarhi, Shivpuri, Sonagiri, Mandla and Ujjain.

Madhya Pradesh is noted for its classical and folk music. Some of the noted Hindustani classical music gharanas in Madhya Pradesh include the Maihar gharana, the Gwalior gharana and Senia gharana. Two of the medieval India's most noted singers, Tansen and Baiju Bawra, were born near Gwalior in present-day Madhya Pradesh. Noted Dhrupad exponents Aminuddin Dagar (Indore), Gundecha Brothers (Ujjain) and Uday Bhawalkar (Ujjain) were also born in present-day Madhya Pradesh. Renowned classical singer Kumar Gandharva spent his life at Dewas. The birthplaces of noted playback singers Kishore Kumar (Khandwa) and Lata Mangeshkar (Indore) and singer and composer Aadesh Shrivastava (Jabalpur) are also located in MP. The local styles of folk singing include Faga, Bhartahari, Sanja geet, Bhopa, Kalbelia, Bhat/Bhand/Charan, Vasdeva, Videsia, Kalgi Turra, Nirgunia, Alha, Pandwani Gayan and Garba Garbi Govalan.

The major folk dances of MP are Rai, Karma, Saila, Matki, Gangaur, Badhai, Baredi, Naurata, Ahiri and Bhagoria.

Economy 

Madhya Pradesh's gross state domestic product (nominal GDP) for 2013–14 was  4,509 billion (approximately  72,726,000,000). The per-capita figure was  871.45 in 2013–14, the sixth-lowest in the country. Between 1999 and 2008, the annualised growth rate of the state was very low: 3.5%. Subsequently, the state's GDP growth rate has improved significantly, rising to 8% during 2010–11 and 12% during 2011–12.

Madhya Pradesh is also famous for honey production in district Morena.

The state has an agrarian economy. The major crops of Madhya Pradesh are wheat, soybean, gram, sugarcane, rice, maize, cotton, rapeseed, mustard and arhar. Minor Forest Produce (MFP), such as tendu leaves used to roll beedi, sal seed, teak seed, and lak also contribute to state's rural economy.

Madhya Pradesh has 5 Special Economic Zones (SEZs): 3 IT/ITeS (Indore, Gwalior), 1 mineral-based (Jabalpur) and 1 agro-based (Jabalpur). In October 2011, approval was given to 14 proposed SEZs, out of which 10 were IT/ITeS-based. Indore is the major commercial centre of the state. Because of the state's central location, a number of consumer goods companies have established manufacturing bases in MP.

The state has the largest reserves of diamond and copper in India. Other major mineral reserves include those of coal, coalbed methane, manganese and dolomite.

Madhya Pradesh has six Ordnance Factories, four of which are located at Jabalpur (Vehicle Factory, Grey Iron Foundry, Gun Carriage Factory, Ordnance Factory Khamaria) and one each at Katni and Itarsi. The factories are run by the Ordnance Factories Board, and manufacture a variety of products for the Indian Armed Forces.

Madhya Pradesh won the 10th National Award for excellent work in Mahatma Gandhi National Rural Employment Guarantee Act, 2005.

The state's tourism industry is growing, fuelled by wildlife tourism and a number of places of historical and religious significance. Sanchi and Khajuraho are frequented by external tourists. Besides the major cities, Bhedaghat, Jabalpur, Bhimbetka, Bhojpur, Maheshwar, Mandu, Orchha, Pachmarhi, Kanha, Amarkantak and Ujjain, Tumen Vindhyavasini temple ancient temple. This south facing Ashok Nagar district located in Tuman (Tumvn).

Infrastructure

Energy 

The state has a total installed power generation capacity of 24950.60 MW as of 30 November 2020. The Madhya Pradesh Electric Board is located at Jabalpur. The Rewa Ultra Mega Solar project is a photovoltaic solar park spread over an area of 1,590 acres (6.4 km2) in the Gurh tehsil of Rewa District of Madhya Pradesh. The project was commissioned with 750 MW capacity. 97% households have electricity access in the state.

The Singrauli region on the eastern end of Madhya Pradesh is a major energy producer enclave for the country. The region has vast reserves of coal mines, which are excavated by Northern Coalfields Limited, a subsidiary of Coal India Limited, which is in turn used in local power plants of NTPC, Sasan Power and Hindalco. The area has more than 10,000 MW installed capacity for energy production.

Transport 

Bus and train services cover most of Madhya Pradesh. The  road network of the state includes 20 national highways. A  rail network criss-crosses the state, with Jabalpur serving as headquarters for the West Central Railway Zone of the Indian Railways. The Central Railway and the Western Railway also cover parts of the state. Most of the western Madhya Pradesh comes under Ratlam Rail Division of Western Railways, including cities like Indore, Ujjain, Mandsaur, Khandwa, Neemuch and Bairagarh in Bhopal. The state has a total of 20 major railway junctions. The major inter-state bus terminals are located in Bhopal, Indore, Gwalior and Jabalpur. More than 2,000 buses are conducted daily from these four cities. The intra-city transit systems mostly consist of buses, private autos and taxis.
More than 455 trains transit through Madhya Pradesh daily. 220 trains transit through the State’s capital Bhopal alone. North–South & East–West corridors cut across Madhya Pradesh. There is convenient access to major ports such as Kandla port and Jawaharlal Nehru port in the state

The state does not have a coastline. Most of the sea trade happens through the Kandla and Jawaharlal Nehru Port (Nhava Sheva) in the neighbouring states, which are well-connected to MP by road and rail networks.

Devi Ahilyabai Holkar Airport in Indore is the busiest airport in Madhya Pradesh. Raja Bhoj International Airport in Bhopal, Dumna Airport in Jabalpur, Gwalior Airport and Khajuraho Airport also have scheduled commercial passenger services. Besides these, minor airstrips are located at Chhindwara, Sagar, Neemuch, Ratlam, Mandsaur, Ujjain, Khandwa, Rewa, Guna and Satna.

Other 
The state has 52 districts hospitals, 333 community health centres, 1,155 primary health centres and 8,860 sub-centres.

The urban infrastructure has improved considerably in the past decade. 22 projects costing above $500 million have been sanctioned under the Jawaharlal Nehru National Urban Renewal Mission for the development of Bhopal, Indore, Jabalpur and Ujjain.

Seven Cities of Madhya Pradesh Bhopal, Indore, Gwalior, Jabalpur, Satna, Ujjain, and Sagar have been selected under Smart cities mission

Media 

Dainik Bhaskar, Dainik Jagran, The Indian Observer, Nava Bharat, Deshbandhu, Nai Duniya, Rajasthan Patrika, Raj Express and Dainik Dabang Dunia are the leading Hindi newspapers. Other local newspapers are published in the cities. In English Times of India, Hindustan Times, The Hitavada, Central Chronicle and Free Press have editions from Bhopal with The Hitavada also being in Jabalpur. A Sindhi daily, i.e., Challenge (Now also in Hindi) is published from Bhopal is the only Sindhi newspaper in state.

Government and politics 

Madhya Pradesh has a 230-seat state legislative assembly. The state also sends 40 members to the Parliament of India: 29 are elected to the Lok Sabha (Lower House) and 11 to the Rajya Sabha (Upper House). The constitutional head of the state is the Governor, appointed by the President of India. The execution powers lie with the Chief Minister, who is the elected leader of the state legislature. The current governor is Mangubhai C. Patel, and the current chief minister is Shivraj Singh Chouhan of the Bharatiya Janata Party (BJP).

The dominant political parties in the state are the Bharatiya Janata Party (BJP) and the Indian National Congress (INC).

Administration 

Madhya Pradesh state is made up of 52 Districts, which are grouped into 10 divisions. As of 2020, the state has 52 jila (district) panchayats, 376 tehsil, 313 janpad panchayats/blocks, and 23043 gram (village) panchayats. The municipalities in the state include 18 Nagar Nigams, 100 Nagar Palikas and 264 Nagar Panchayats.

Villages 
 

Dhekal Badi

Education 

According to the 2011 census, Madhya Pradesh had a literacy rate of 69.32%. According to the 2009–10 figures, the state had 105,592 primary schools, 6,352 high schools, and 5,161 higher secondary schools. The state has 208 engineering and architecture colleges, 208 management institutes, and 12 medical colleges.

The state is home to some of the premier educational and research institutions of India including IIT Indore, IIM Indore, AIIMS Bhopal, NIT Bhopal, IIITDM Jabalpur, IIITM Gwalior, Indian Institute of Tourism and Travel Management (IITTM Gwalior), Indian Institute of Science Education and Research (IISER) Bhopal, School of Planning and Architecture, Bhopal, Indian Institute of Forest Management (IIFM) Bhopal, National Law Institute University (NLIU) Bhopal Jabalpur Engineering College, Dharmashastra National Law University, Jabalpur.

There are 500 degree colleges, which are affiliated with one of the universities in the state. The specialised universities include Rajiv Gandhi Technical University, Madhya Pradesh Medical Science University, Jawaharlal Nehru Agriculture University and Nanaji Deshmukh Veterinary Science University. The general universities are Awadhesh Pratap Singh University (Rewa), Barkatullah University (Bhopal), Devi Ahilya Vishwavidyalaya (Indore), Rani Durgavati University (Jabalpur), Vikram University (Ujjain), Jiwaji University (Gwalior), Dr. Hari Singh Gour University (Sagar), Indira Gandhi National Tribal University (Amarkantak, Anuppur), Makhanlal Chaturvedi National University of Journalism and Communication (Bhopal).

The Professional Examination Board was initialised as Pre Medical Test Board by Government of Madhya Pradesh in the year 1970. After some year in 1981, Pre Engineering Board was constituted. Then after, in the year 1982 both these boards were amalgamated and named as Madhya Pradesh Professional Examination Board (MPPEB).

Tourism

Notable people

Sports 

In 2013, state govt declared Mallakhamba as the state sport.

Cricket, kabaddi, hockey, football, basketball, volleyball, cycling, swimming, badminton, and table tennis are the popular sports in the state. Traditional games like kho kho, gilli danda, sitoliya, kanche, and langdi are popular in the rural areas.

Snooker, a cue sport, generally regarded as having been invented in Jabalpur by British Army officers, is popular in many of the English-speaking and Commonwealth countries, with top professional players attaining multimillion-pound career earnings from the game.

Cricket is the most popular sport in Madhya Pradesh. There are three international cricket stadiums in the state – Nehru Stadium (Indore), Roop Singh Stadium (Gwalior) and Holkar Cricket Stadium (Indore). Madhya Pradesh cricket team's best performances in Ranji Trophy was in 1998–99, when the Chandrakant Pandit-led team ended as the runner-up. Its predecessor, the Indore-based Holkar cricket team, had won the Ranji Trophy four times. In year 2022, Chandrakant Pandit coached Madhya Pradesh cricket team defeated 41 time champion Mumbai Cricket Team in Ranji Trophy 2021-2022 season. It is Madhya Pradesh's maiden title at M. Chinnaswamy Stadium.

Aishbagh Stadium in Bhopal is the home ground for World Series Hockey team Bhopal Badshahs. The state also has a football team that participates in the Santosh Trophy.

MP United FC is an Indian football that played in the 2nd Division I-League.

On 6 December 2017, the Madhya Pradesh Chief Minister Shivraj Singh Chouhan announced that players from the state would be given government jobs on winning medals in international events.

Madhu Yadav, the former Captain of the India women's national field hockey team, a 1982 Asian Games gold medallist and an Arjuna Award recipient, is from Jabalpur.

See also 
 Outline of Madhya Pradesh
 Directorate Sports and Youth Welfare
 Districts of Madhya Pradesh
 List of forts in Madhya Pradesh
 List of people from Madhya Pradesh

References

Further reading 

 Gyanendra Singh. Farm Mechanization in Madhya Pradesh. Bhopal: Central Institute of Agricultural Engineering, 2000.
 Madhya Pradesh (India). The Madhya Pradesh Human Development Report 2002: Using the Power of Democracy for Development. [Bhopal: Govt. of Madhya Pradesh, 2002].
 Guru Radha Kishan Swatantrata Sangraam Senani from Madhya Pradesh: Archives Nehru Memorial Museum and Library, New Delhi.
 Rag, Pankaj. Vintage, Madhya Pradesh: A Collection of Old Photographs. Bhopal: Madhya Pradesh Madhyam jointly with the Directorate of Archaeology, Archives, and Museums, 2005. 
 Parmar, Shyam. Folk Tales of Madhya Pradesh. Folk tales of India series, 12". New Delhi: Sterling Publishers, 1973.
 Rag, Pankaj, and O. P. Misra. Masterpieces of Madhya Pradesh. Bhopal: Directorate of Archaeology, Archives & Museums, Government of Madhya Pradesh, 2005.
 Sampath, M. D., H. V. Trivedi, and Mandan Trivedi. Epigraphs of Madhya Pradesh. New Delhi: Archaeological Survey of India, 2001.
 Sati, Vishwambhar Prasad. Madhya Pradesh, a Geo-Economic Appraisal. Delhi: Abhijeet, 2004. 
 Shah, Shampa, and Aashi Manohar. Tribal Arts and Crafts of Madhya Pradesh. Living traditions of India. Ahmedabad: Mapin Pub./in Association with Vanya Prakashan, Bhopal, 1996.

External links 

 Government
   
 General information  
   
   
 
  
 

 
States and union territories of India
States and territories established in 1956
1956 establishments in India